Gorintaku is a 2008 Indian Telugu-language drama film directed by V. R. Prathap and starring Rajasekhar, Aarthi Agarwal, Meera Jasmine, Akash, and Hema Choudhary in the lead roles. The film was a remake of the successful Kannada movie Anna Thangi, starring Shiva Rajkumar. The music was composed by S. A. Rajkumar. It was dubbed, partially reshot and released in Tamil as Maruthani on 10 September 2010 with an additional comedy track of Mayilswamy and Aarthi.

Plot
Ashok (Rajasekhar) and Lakshmi (Meera Jasmine) are siblings, and their father Sarvarayudu (Rajasekhar), who was a landlord of the village, and mother (Sujitha) die during their childhood. Ashok and Lakshmi turn inseparable. Lakshmi falls in love with Aakash (Akash) but makes it clear that she would love or marry him only with the blessings and acceptance of her brother, which he approves of. Ashok marries Nandini (Aarthi Agarwal) on the same day. After their marriage, Aakash and Lakshmi lead a happy life, along with Aakash's cousins and sisters-in-law. In a gap of seven years, Lakshmi has two daughters and a son. Nandini also becomes pregnant but suffers a miscarriage due to the intervention of one Kantham (Hema Choudhary), who stays with her claiming to be her aunt. As Nandini's uterus was removed, Ashok turns childless. To please him, Aakash and Lakshmi bring their children to cajole him. By the time Aakash returns to their house, his cousins cheat him and swindle the entire property. He gets jailed in a cheque bounce case. Lakshmi and her children then turn orphans. With the Kantham's advice, Nandini throws Lakshmi out of the house and warns her not to try to meet her brother. Lakshmi now has no way to save her husband and family. She and her children commit suicide. Upon learning this, Ashok also dies, proving that they are inseparable even in death.

Cast

Rajasekhar - Ashok & Sarvarayudu
Meera Jasmine - Lakshmi, Ashok's sister
Aarthi Agarwal - Nandini
Akash - Akash
Hema Choudhary - Suryakantham
Master Nidheesh - Lakshmi's son
Sujitha - Sarvarayudu's wife
Chandra Mohan
Sivaji Raja
Venu Madhav
Brahmaji
Ravi Prakash
Banerjee
Jeeva
Uttej
Surya

Soundtrack 
Music for film was composed by S. A. Rajkumar. S.A.Rajkumar retained three songs from original version which are composed by Hamsalekha. "Dum Dum Dum"  retained as " Dum Dum Dum", "Anna Thangiyara" retained as "Anna Chellela" and "Anna Nammonadharu" retained as "Yeradilo Koila".

External links

References

2008 films
2000s Telugu-language films
Telugu remakes of Kannada films